Fábregas, Fàbregas or Fàbregues is a Catalan surname, deriving from any of the places in Barcelona province named Fàbregues, from the plural of Fàbrega (forge).

Bearers of the surname include:

Augusto Fábrega, former Ambassador of Panama to Russia
Cesc Fàbregas, footballer for Como 1907 and the Spanish national team
Elisenda Fábregas, Spanish/American composer
Francisco Fábregas Bosch, former Spanish field hockey player
Jaime Fabregas, Filipino actor
Jorge Fábregas, former Major League Baseball catcher
José María Pinilla Fábrega, former President of Panama (1968–1969)
José Luis Fábrega, Mayor of Panama City since 2019
Juan Carlos Fábrega, former president of the Central Bank of Argentina
Ludovic Fabregas, French handball player for FC Barcelona and the French national team 
Pedro Fábregas, officer at American Airlines Group, the parent company of American Airlines
Virginia Fábregas (1871–1950), Mexican film and stage actress

See also 
Fabregat

References  

Catalan-language surnames